Pretty Wild is a lingerie brand from the Netherlands. It was founded in 2011 by Firouzè Akhbari. In 2015, the company was acquired by Sparotica SPQR Limited (formerly MRH Sparotica Groupe).

History

2011—2015: Foundation Years
In 2011, Firouzè Akhbari crafted lingerie pieces for clients, such as Lady Gagat. Pretty Wild presented its first broadly distributed lingerie collection which featured lace from France and Italy in 2013.

The following year, the company secured a private label production agreement with Moldova based lingerie manufacturer Olga Ceban Apparel with the assistance of The United States Agency for International Development.

In January 2015, Pretty Wild made its fashion week debut in Amsterdam, presenting at Mercedes-Benz Fashion Week Amsterdam.

Acquisition 

In December 2015, Pretty Wild filed for bankruptcy. Sparotica SPQR acquired Pretty Wild and began a 5-year plan for expansion, which include 40 brick and mortar stores and China e-commerce.

Marketing

Broadcast Events

In March 2015, Pretty Wild's Fashion Week Amsterdam debut was broadcast on Fashion One.

In September 2016, Pretty Wild appeared in Episode 4 of 2017 Holland's Next Top Model (cycle 9), hosted by Anouk Smulders.

Campaigns

The inaugural Pretty Wild campaign debuted in Fall 2013, and was shot by photography duo Ronald Stoops & Inge Grognard.

References

External links
Official website

Clothing brands of the Netherlands
Dutch brands
Clothing companies established in 2011
Retail companies established in 2011
Lingerie brands
Dutch fashion
Companies based in Amsterdam
Clothing companies of the Netherlands